The Intercontinental Cup (known as the  Hero Intercontinental Cup for sponsorship reasons) is a 4-team association football tournament organised by the All India Football Federation (AIFF). It was launched in 2017, as a replacement for Nehru Cup with the first edition held as the 2017 Hero Tri-Nation Series. The tournament was organized by the AIFF as part of the senior men team's preparation for the third round of 2019 AFC Asian Cup qualification matches and for the Asian Cup itself. The tournament naming rights were purchased by Hero MotoCorp which also sponsors the national team. The tournament succeeded the Nehru Cup, where the then Indian head coach at that time, Stephen Constantine revealed that the intention was to hold a 4-team tournament with India competing against teams from the Caribbean, Africa, and Asia.

Results

Medal summary

References

External links
 Hero Intercontinental Cup

International association football competitions hosted by India
2017 establishments in India
Recurring sporting events established in 2017